USCGC Joseph Doyle (WPC-1133) is the United States Coast Guard's 33rd  cutter. She was completed, and transferred to Coast Guard, in Key West, for her acceptance trials, on March 21, 2019. She was commissioned on June 8, 2019, and the first of a second cohort of cutters commissioned in San Juan, Puerto Rico. The first batch of six cutters were commissioned there in 2015 and 2016.

Design

Like her sister ships, Joseph Doyle is designed to perform search and rescue missions, port security, and the interception of smugglers.  She is armed with a remotely-controlled, gyro-stabilized 25 mm autocannon, four crew served M2 Browning machine guns, and light arms. She is equipped with a stern launching ramp, that allows her to launch or retrieve a water-jet propelled high-speed auxiliary boat, without first coming to a stop.  Her high-speed boat has over-the-horizon capability, and is useful for inspecting other vessels, and deploying boarding parties.

The crew's drinking water needs are met through a desalination unit.  The crew mess is equipped with a television with satellite reception.

Namesake

In 2010, Charles "Skip" W. Bowen, who was then the United States Coast Guard's most senior non-commissioned officer, proposed that all 58 cutters in the Sentinel class should be named after enlisted sailors in the Coast Guard, or one of its precursor services, who were recognized for their heroism.  The Coast Guard chose Joseph Doyle would be the namesake of the 33rd cutter.  Doyle started serving as the keeper of the Charlotte, New York Life Saving Station, in 1878, where he became one of the most admired keepers of the United States Lifesaving Service.

References

Sentinel-class cutters
Ships built in Lockport, Louisiana
2019 ships